Christiania Lutheran Free Church (now Highview Christiania Lutheran Church - ELCA) is a historic church in Eureka Township, Minnesota, United States.

In the early 1850s, a group of Norwegian immigrant first arrived in Eureka Township. A Norwegian language Lutheran congregation was formally organized in 1860. Their church was first known as the Norwegian-Danish Evangelical Lutheran Church in Christiana Settlement.  The carpenter Gothic church was built under the direction of Hans Berg Larsen between 1877-78. It located on the site of the congregation's original 1865 log church. The church was dedicated in 1878.  It is one of the oldest church buildings in continuous use in the state of Minnesota.  Christiania Lutheran Free Church has been known as the Highview Christiania Lutheran Church since 1966. The church building was added to the National Register of Historic Places in 2010.

References

External links
Highview Christiania Lutheran Church
Highview Christiana Cemetery

Carpenter Gothic church buildings in Minnesota
Churches completed in 1878
Churches in Dakota County, Minnesota
Churches on the National Register of Historic Places in Minnesota
Lutheran churches in Minnesota
National Register of Historic Places in Dakota County, Minnesota
Norwegian-American culture in Minnesota